Vasily Danilovich Sokolovsky (July 21, 1897 – May 10, 1968) was a Soviet general and Marshal of the Soviet Union who led Red Army forces on the Eastern Front during World War II. As Georgy Zhukov's chief of staff, Sokolovsky helped plan and execute the Battle of Berlin.

Early life 
Sokolovsky was born into a Belarusian peasant family in Kozliki, a small town in the province of Grodno (now in Białystok County in eastern Poland, then part of the Russian Empire). He worked as a teacher in a rural school, where he took part in a number of protests and demonstrations against the Tsar.

Military career

Sokolovsky joined the Red Army in February 1918.

He began his formal military schooling in 1919, but was frequently called up by the Red Army and forced to leave his schoolwork. He graduated in 1921 and became the chief of staff of a division stationed in Turkmenistan. He was wounded during a battle near Samarkand and subsequently decorated for bravery. After the Russian Civil War ended in 1922/1923 he held a number of staff positions, eventually becoming the chief of staff for the Moscow Military District and then the Deputy Chief of the  General Staff, the position he held at the beginning of the German invasion of the Soviet Union, Operation Barbarossa (22 June 1941).

In December 1941, with German forces a mere 20 kilometers from Moscow, Sokolovsky was made the chief of staff of the Soviet Western Front, where he was able to help co-ordinate the  Soviet winter  counter-attacks that forced the Germans away from Moscow. He remained in this position until February 1943, when he became the commander of the Western Front.

He led this front through the Battle of Kursk. In the summer of 1943, the Soviets launched Operation Kutuzov on 12 July against Army Group Centre in the Orel salient, directly north of the Kursk salient. The Bryansk Front, under the command of Markian Popov, attacked the eastern face of the Orel salient while the Western Front, commanded by Sokolovsky, attacked from the north. The operation ended on 18 August 1943 with the Soviet capture of Orel and collapse of the Orel bulge. In October–November 1943, Sokolovsky commanded the Western Front in failed Soviet Orsha offensives against Gotthard Heinrici's 4th Army in the Orsha region of Belarus. In April 1944 the Western Front was broken into two parts and Sokolovsky was made chief of staff of 1st Ukrainian Front under Georgy Zhukov. He remained in this position until the end of the war in 1945. As the chief of staff of 1st Ukrainian Front, Sokolovsky helped plan and execute the capture of Berlin. Sokolovsky sat next to Zhukov as he accepted the German Instrument of Surrender in Berlin.

After World War II, Sokolovsky became the deputy commander-in-chief of the Soviet Forces in East Germany until July 3, 1946. On that day Sokolovsky was promoted to the rank of Marshal of the Soviet Union, and also made commander-in-chief of the Group of Soviet Forces in Germany and head of the Soviet Military Administration in Germany. His walking out of a meeting of the Allied Control Council on 20 March 1948 as the Soviet representative on that body effectively immobilized it from that date. In 1949 he became the Soviet Union's Deputy  Minister of Defense, a position he held until 1952, when he was made the  Chief of the General Staff. In 1960 Sokolovsky became the Inspector-General of the Ministry of Defense. He retained this position until his death in 1968.

Sokolovsky became widely known in the West with the publication in 1962 of Military Strategy, a book that contained rare detail on Soviet thinking about war, particularly nuclear war.

Sokolovsky was a key member of the Soviet war command during World War II and known as an excellent planner and exceptional military leader. He was particularly well-trusted by Marshal Georgy Zhukov. 

Sokolovsky died on May 10, 1968 at aged 70. The urn containing his ashes was buried in the Kremlin Wall Necropolis.

Sokolovsky appears as a prominent figure in William T. Vollmann's 2005 National Book Award-winning novel, Europe Central.

Honours and awards

Soviet Union

Foreign awards

References

External links

 

1897 births
1968 deaths
People from Białystok County
People from Belostoksky Uyezd
Central Committee of the Communist Party of the Soviet Union members
Second convocation members of the Supreme Soviet of the Soviet Union
Third convocation members of the Supreme Soviet of the Soviet Union
Fourth convocation members of the Supreme Soviet of the Soviet Union
Fifth convocation members of the Supreme Soviet of the Soviet Union
Sixth convocation members of the Supreme Soviet of the Soviet Union
Seventh convocation members of the Supreme Soviet of the Soviet Union
Marshals of the Soviet Union
Russian military writers
Soviet people of Belarusian descent
People of the Russian Civil War
Soviet military personnel of World War II
Heroes of the Soviet Union
Recipients of the Order of Suvorov, 1st class
Recipients of the Order of Lenin
Recipients of the Order of the Red Banner
Recipients of the Order of Kutuzov, 1st class
Recipients of the Patriotic Order of Merit
Recipients of the Virtuti Militari (1943–1989)
Commanders of the Virtuti Militari
Recipients of the Order of the Cross of Grunwald, 3rd class
Grand Crosses of the Order of the White Lion
Commanders of the Legion of Merit
Grand Officiers of the Légion d'honneur
Honorary Knights Grand Cross of the Order of the British Empire
Burials at the Kremlin Wall Necropolis
Frunze Military Academy alumni